Sarker is a surname. Notable people with the surname include:

 Jatin Sarker (born 1936), Bangladeshi writer
 Malabika Sarker (born 1964), Bangladeshi physician and public health scientist
 Paul Sarker, Bangladeshi Protestant bishop
 Rebecca Sarker (born 1975), English actress
 Sunetra Sarker (born 1973), English actress

See also
 Parker (surname)